The New Force was a political party in Iceland that merged into the Liberal Party in 2006–07. It never had parliamentary representation. The party was opposed to further immigration.

Election results 

Defunct political parties in Iceland
Political parties with year of establishment missing
Political parties disestablished in the 2000s
2000s disestablishments in Iceland

References